Polites is a genus of North American butterflies of the family Hesperiidae (skippers), subfamily Hesperiinae (grass skippers).

Species
Listed alphabetically within groups:

The themistocles species group:
Polites draco (W.H. Edwards, 1871) – draco skipper
Polites mardon (W.H. Edwards, 1881) – Mardon skipper, Cascades skipper or little Oregon skipper 
Polites norae MacNeill, 1993
Polites peckius (W. Kirby, 1837) – Peck's skipper or yellowpatch skipper
Polites sabuleti (Boisduval, 1852) – sandhill skipper or saltgrass skipper 
Polites themistocles (Latreille, 1824) – tawny-edged skipper

The origenes species group:
Polites mystic (W.H. Edwards, 1863) – long dash skipper
Polites origenes (Fabricius, 1793) – crossline skipper
Polites pupillus (Plötz, 1882)
Polites puxillius (Mabille, 1891)
Polites sonora (Scudder, 1872) – Sonoran skipper

The rhesus species group:
Polites carus (Edwards, 1883) – desert gray skipper, Carus skipper 
Polites rhesus (W.H. Edwards, 1878) – Rhesus skipper
Polites subreticulata (Plötz, 1883)

The vibex species group:
Polites vibex (Geyer, [1832]) – whirlabout

Unnamed species group:
Polites baracoa (Lucas, 1857) – Baracoa skipper
Polites bittiae Lindsey, 1925
Polites vibicoides de Jong, 1983

References

External links
Grass Skippers, Butterflies and Moths of North America

 
Butterflies of North America
Hesperiidae genera
Taxa named by Samuel Hubbard Scudder